Caerleon Comprehensive School is an 11–18 mixed, English-medium community Secondary School and Sixth Form in Caerleon, Newport, Wales.

The school was ranked 6th in the WalesOnline Best Secondary Schools in Wales 2018 awards, and was given the title of best school in the area.

Identity

All pupils are required to wear a uniform, including grey trousers or a knee-length skirt, a navy blue jumper, a navy blue blazer, a sky blue shirt and a maroon tie for boys or a pin badge girls. Sixth formers are distinguished through white shirts and full, maroon ties.

The school crest comprises a Roman eagle above the emblem of a fortress (in reference to the town's Isca Augusta Roman fortress). This is underscored by the school's motto, 'Maximising Potential'.

Location

The school's catchment area covers primary schools in Caerleon and Ponthir, along with Langstone Primary School, Usk Junior School and some students from central Newport schools. The catchment boundaries extend to Caerleon, Ponthir, Llanfrechfa, Llantrisant, Penhow, and Llanmartin.

Parental concerns in Monmouthshire were raised in 2019 as Monmouthshire County Council brought new boundaries into effect, meaning Usk Primary School students are to move to Monmouth Comprehensive School from September 2020, having historically attended Caerleon since 1996.

Academic performance 

There are 1,484 pupils on roll, of which 350 are A-Level students studying at the Sixth Form.

The school was ranked by WalesOnline as 6th in Wales and 1st in the nearby area. According to a 2016 Estyn inspection, all students leaving at Key Stage 4 left with a recognized qualification.

In 2019 two individuals were celebrated for achievements at the school. ICT teacher Phil Meredith was highlighted at the Professional Teaching Awards Cymru, and the school has seen wide success in STEM education, with a young student in 2019 winning an award at the GlaxoSmithKline Big Bang UK Young Scientists and Engineers Fair in Birmingham.

Modern Foreign Languages 

Caerleon has in recent years been covered by local media as it is now the only Newport state school offering German as a subject choice to students, amid cuts elsewhere to language education among UK schools. Its language teachers founded the South Wales-wide teachers network for language education in the region. The school also offers Welsh and French to Advanced Level study.

Sports 

The school has traditionally produced a number of sporting names across a range of disciplines. The school has multiple rugby union, football, and netball sides, as well as offering tennis courts and basketball facilities for physical education lessons. The school is also near to the Celtic Manor operated Caerleon Golf Course and the full size cricket, football, and rugby facilities on the neighbouring Caerleon Pavilion.

Names linked to Caerleon who have been successful in sporting endeavours include Dragons player and Ireland Under-20 Grand Slam winner James McCarthy, Dragons and Wales international Tyler Morgan, and Wales Wales U20 capped Ashton Hewitt.

Historic sportspeople who have attended the school include Wales, Chelsea F.C. and Swansea City goalkeeper Roger Freestone, Cardiff City F.C. and Wales midfielder Nigel Vaughan, Wales rugby winger Nick Walne, and prop Lyndon Mustoe. Others include Gary Hocking, a Grand Prix racing champion, as well as footballer and cricketer Len Hill.

Finances 

In June 2019, local press reported that issues had arisen at the school, with a £500,000 loan from Newport City Council due to be paid, and debts totalling £1.6m forecast for the next 18 months. Appointed auditors stated that financial practices at the school were "not well controlled" requiring urgent changes. However school reserves in 2016/17 were reported to finally be positive, having been in negative balance from 2012–2014.

The school is set to receive investment from the £70m Welsh Government 21st Century School programme. Further investment in the school is also forecast upon the redevelopment of the former University of Wales, Newport campus which awaits planning permission.

Notable former pupils 

Nigel Vaughan, Wales international footballer
Nick Walne, Wales international rugby union player
Ashley Smith, Rhys Jenkins, Tyler Morgan and Ashton Hewitt: Dragons rugby union players
Greg Pritchard, countertenor and contestant and semi-finalist in the 2009 series of Britain's Got Talent.
Steve Lowndes, Wales international footballer, former teacher
Rachel Rice, 2008 Big Brother winner. She also undertook teacher-training at the school, during the spring of 2008, prior to her appearance
Darragh Mortell, actor
Tyler Morgan, Wales international rugby union player
Caroline Sheen, actor

References

External links
 
Real Schools Guide 2018 - Caerleon Comprehensive School
Estyn - Caerleon Comprehensive School

Secondary schools in Newport, Wales
Caerleon